Dame Mary Elizabeth Uprichard, DBE, FRCM (born March 1938) is a British nursing, midwifery and health care activist. She was made Dame Commander of the Order of the British Empire in  1998.

Positions
 First President of the UKCC
 Vice-President of the Royal College of Midwives (RCM)
 Chairwoman of the Nurses' Professional Conduct Committee
 Lay Secretary (until 2011) on the Board of Governors of Methodist College, Belfast

Publications
 The Evolution of Midwifery Training (Midwives Chronicle: January 1987;)
 Myles textbook for midwives, Myles, Bennett, Brown & Uprichard (eds), (Churchill Livingstone Publishing, 1993)

Legacies
 Dame Mary Uprichard Prize for Excellence in Midwifery Studies (Queen's University Belfast)
 Dame Mary Uprichard Annual Lecture

External links
Nursing & Midwifery Council website
"UKCC: is it now fit to govern?"
Annual Report (2008) of the Board of Governors of the Methodist Church
Royal College of Midwives site
Profile, checkcompany.co.uk; accessed 16 June 2016.

1938 births
Living people
Dames Commander of the Order of the British Empire
Date of birth missing (living people)
Nurses from Northern Ireland
British midwives
Methodists from Northern Ireland
People from County Down
Place of birth missing (living people)